PS Tattershall Castle is a floating pub and restaurant moored on the River Thames at Victoria Embankment. It was a passenger ferry across the Humber estuary from 1934 to 1973, before being towed to London in 1976.

History
William Gray & Company of West Hartlepool built the ship as a passenger ferry on the Humber for the London and North Eastern Railway (LNER). She was launched on 24 September 1934. She plied the Humber Ferry route between Corporation Pier in Kingston upon Hull, Yorkshire, and New Holland Pier in New Holland, Lincolnshire.

In the Second World War she was a tether for barrage balloons and ferried troops and supplies along the River Humber. Due to the frequent heavy fogs on this river, she was fitted with radar, becoming one of the first civilian ships so equipped. After the war, with the nationalisation of the railways in 1948, she became part of British Rail's Sealink service.

In 1973, after long service as a passenger and goods ferry, she was retired and laid up. In 1976 the ship was towed to London. Repairs on the ship were deemed too costly and she was retired from service. The opening of the Humber Bridge made the ferry service redundant.

Tattershall Castle was first opened on the River Thames as a floating art gallery until her eventual disposal to the Chef & Brewer group. Before opening in 1982 as a restaurant, she was sent to the River Medway for further repairs. Tattershall Castle returned temporarily to Hull for a refit at MMS Ship Repair in 2015, at a cost of several million pounds.

  

References

External links

Official website
PS Tattershall Castle at thisishartlepool.co.uk
PS Tattershall Castle at Paddle Steamer Resources by Tramscape

Pubs in the City of Westminster
Tourist attractions in London
Ferries of England
Paddle steamers of the United Kingdom
Ships built on the River Tees
1934 ships
Tourist attractions in the City of Westminster
Ships of British Rail
Ships and vessels on the National Register of Historic Vessels
Victoria Embankment
Floating restaurants